Earl Jay "Fuzz" Merritt (August 9, 1896 – July 7, 1986) was an American football, basketball, and baseball coach. He served as the head football coach at Pomona College in Claremont, California, from 1935 to 1958, compiling a record of 93–67–13. Merritt also coached basketball and baseball at Pomona.

Early life and education
Merritt attended Pomona, where he lettered in football, basketball, baseball, and track. He played quarterback on the football team and as a center fielder on the baseball team. In track, he participated in the hammer throw, discus throw, and pole vault.

Coaching career
Following his graduation in 1925, Merritt join's Pomona's coaching staff. He coached the freshman football team for ten seasons before succeeding Eugene W. Nixon as head coach of the varsity football team in 1935.

Death and legacy
In December 1960, Merrit was elected to the National Association of Intercollegiate Athletics Hall of Fame. He died on July 7, 1986. The football field of the Pomona-Pitzer Sagehens was renamed Merritt Field in his honor in 1991.

Head coaching record

See also
 List of Pomona College people

References

1896 births
1986 deaths
American football quarterbacks
American male discus throwers
American male hammer throwers
American male pole vaulters
Baseball outfielders
Pomona-Pitzer Sagehens baseball coaches
Pomona-Pitzer Sagehens baseball players
Pomona-Pitzer Sagehens football coaches
Pomona-Pitzer Sagehens football players
Pomona-Pitzer Sagehens men's basketball coaches
Pomona-Pitzer Sagehens men's basketball players
College men's track and field athletes in the United States
Pomona College alumni
Sportspeople from Duluth, Minnesota